In statistics, Basu's theorem states that any boundedly complete minimal sufficient statistic is independent of any ancillary statistic. This is a 1955 result of Debabrata Basu.

It is often used in statistics as a tool to prove independence of two statistics, by first demonstrating one is complete sufficient and the other is ancillary, then appealing to the theorem. An example of this is to show that the sample mean and sample variance of a normal distribution are independent statistics, which is done in the Example section below. This property (independence of sample mean and sample variance) characterizes normal distributions.

Statement 
(Such maps are called a statistic.) That is, .

Proof 

Denote by  the preimage of a set  under the map . For any measurable set  we have

The distribution  does not depend on   because   is ancillary. Likewise,  does not depend on  because  is sufficient. Therefore

Therefore, since  is boundedly complete the function

for almost all .

Example

Independence of sample mean and sample variance of a normal distribution
Let X1, X2, ..., Xn be independent, identically distributed normal random variables with mean μ and variance σ2.

Then with respect to the parameter μ, one can show that

the sample mean, is a complete and sufficient statistic – it is all the information one can derive to estimate μ, and no more – and

the sample variance, is an ancillary statistic – its distribution does not depend on μ.

This independence result can also be proven by Cochran's theorem.

Further, this property (that the sample mean and sample variance of the normal distribution are independent) characterizes the normal distribution – no other distribution has this property.

Notes

References
 
 Mukhopadhyay, Nitis (2000). Probability and Statistical Inference. Statistics: A Series of Textbooks and Monographs. 162. Florida: CRC Press USA. .
 
 

Theorems in statistics
Independence (probability theory)
Articles containing proofs